John Walter Wilkins (born 13 July 1989) is a French-American-Moroccan professional basketball player who currently plays for Stade Malien. He currently plays for the CRA Hoceima club of the Nationale 1, Morocco’s first division.
He is the son of former NBA player Jeff Wilkins.

Professional career 
Wilkins started his professional career in 2013 with Liège Basket in the Belgian Pro Basketball League.

After two seasons, Wilkins played three seasons in Morocco, one with CRA Hoceima and two with Ittihad Tanger. After one year with ART Giants Düsseldorf of the German third level ProB, he returned to Morocco to play for KACM.

In the 2021–22 season, Wilkins played in the French fourth division for BC Liévinois.

Wilkins played as an import player with Stade Malien in the 2023 BAL season.

National team career 
Wilkins played for Morocco's national team at the 2017 AfroBasket in Tunisia and Senegal.

References

External links
 FIBA profile
 Real GM profile
 Afrobasket.com profile

1989 births
Living people
Power forwards (basketball)
Centers (basketball)
Moroccan men's basketball players
Moroccan people of American descent
Moroccan people of French descent
Illinois State Redbirds men's basketball players
French men's basketball players
American men's basketball players
Stade Malien basketball players
Ittihad Tanger basketball players
Liège Basket players
Chabab Rif Al Hoceima basketball players
KACM basketball players
ART Giants Düsseldorf players
AS Salé (basketball) players